is a passenger railway station  located in the city of Yonago, Tottori Prefecture, Japan. It is operated by the West Japan Railway Company (JR West).

Lines

Station layout
The station consists of two opposed ground-level side platforms connected by a level crossing. The station is unattended.

Platforms

Adjacent stations

History
Yumigahama Station opened on July 1, 1917.

Passenger statistics
In fiscal 2018, the station was used by an average of 664 passengers daily.

Surrounding area
Yonago Municipal Yumigahama Junior High School
Yonago Municipal Yumigahama Elementary School

See also
List of railway stations in Japan

References

External links 

  Yumigahama Station from JR-Odekake.net 

Railway stations in Japan opened in 1917
Railway stations in Tottori Prefecture
Stations of West Japan Railway Company
Yonago, Tottori